Thomastown is a village and district of the large community of Tonyrefail, within Rhondda Cynon Taf, South Wales.  It is located to the south of Tonyrefail within the 'Tonyrefail West' electoral ward, and falls within the Ely Valley along the A4119.

Thomastown is also a community ward for elections to Tonyrefail & District Community Council.

References

Villages in Rhondda Cynon Taf